Helen Pluckrose is a British author and cultural writer known for critiques of critical social justice and promotion of liberal ethics, most notably in the grievance studies affair.

Education
Pluckrose completed a degree in English literature at the University of East London and a master's degree in early modern studies at Queen Mary University of London, with a particular focus on "the ways in which medieval women negotiated the Christian narrative".

Career

Social care 
From the age of 17 to 34, Pluckrose worked in social care mostly providing for the personal care needs of elderly people and those with physical and learning disabilities.

Grievance studies affair 

Alongside James A. Lindsay and Peter Boghossian, Pluckrose was involved in the 2017–18 grievance studies affair (also referred to as "Sokal Squared" in reference to the 1996 Sokal affair), a project which saw the group submitting a number of bogus academic papers to peer-reviewed journals in cultural, gender, queer and race studies, to see if they would get published. The authors stated their goal as highlighting poor scholarship and eroding criteria in some academic fields, particularly those influenced by postmodern philosophy and critical theory. Despite criticism of the exposé as a "hoax" and "coordinated attack from the right", Pluckrose and her colleagues describe themselves as "left-leaning liberals".

Areo Magazine
From 2018 to 2021, Pluckrose was editor-in-chief of Areo Magazine, an opinion and analysis digital magazine exploring "a variety of perspectives compatible with broadly liberal and humanist values". She stepped down from this post in April 2021.

Cynical Theories 
In 2020, Pluckrose released a non-fiction book, Cynical Theories, co-authored with James A. Lindsay and published by Pitchstone Publishing.

Counterweight 

Pluckrose founded Counterweight as a reaction to the growth of implicit bias training and other forms of what Pluckrose calls "critical social justice ideology" in the workplace.
The group describes itself as a "non-partisan, grassroots movement advocating for liberal concepts of social justice".
Counterweight launched an online advice service in January 2021, which Pluckrose described as "Citizens Advice for the culture wars".
The group published a video which, according to The Telegraph, argued that "woke" activism unfairly judges people by their gender, race and sex, and pledged to provide resources such as mental health support and "expert guidance". Pluckrose stopped actively working for Counterweight in 2022 but continues to support the cause.

Personal life 
Pluckrose lives in London with her husband David, a forklift driver, and their child.

See also 
 Culture war

References

External links
 Areo magazine, 'About'

Year of birth missing (living people)
Living people
21st-century British non-fiction writers
Alumni of Queen Mary University of London
Alumni of the University of East London
English magazine editors
English women non-fiction writers
Women magazine editors
21st-century English women
21st-century English people
Hoaxers